Marcus Blake is an American, Los Angeles based, musician and songwriter.  He is primarily a bass guitarist but also sings lead and backing vocals and plays guitar.  Blake has written, played, recorded and toured with numerous bands and artists and musical luminaries since 1993, including:  Rollins Band, Daniel Lanois, Sparks, Pearl, Meat Loaf, Alice Cooper, Tony Visconti, Wayne Kramer and George Clinton.  Blake is currently working on his first solo album and recently contributed his solo song "Don't Taser Me, Bro!" to the Occupy This Album compilation.  Blake is also a music journalist having interviewed top record producers and being published in Spain's Popular 1 Magazine and Blurt magazine.

References

External links
 Marcus Blake at Discogs.com
 May 2000 Global Bass Online article
 January 24, 2011 Blurt interview of Daniel Lanois by Marcus Blake (Pt. 1)
 January 24, 2011 Blurt interview of Daniel Lanois by Marcus Blake (Pt. 2)
 Marcus Blake - official website

Year of birth missing (living people)
Living people
American blues guitarists
American male guitarists
American male singer-songwriters
Rollins Band members
American blues singer-songwriters